The 11th Empire Awards ceremony (officially known as the Sony Ericsson Empire Awards), presented by the British film magazine Empire, honored the best films of 2005 and took place on 13 March 2006 at the Hilton London Metropole Hotel in London, England. During the ceremony, Empire presented Empire Awards in 11 categories as well as four honorary awards. The awards for Best Comedy, Best Horror, Best Sci-Fi/Fantasy and Best Thriller as well as the honorary Empire Icon Award were first introduced this year. Other changes include Best Film and Best British Film being renamed this year only to "Best Movie" and "Best British Movie" respectively. The honorary Lifetime Achievement Award was presented for the last time. English actor Bill Bailey hosted the show for the second time, having previously hosted the 9th ceremony held in 2004. The awards were sponsored by Sony Ericsson for the fourth consecutive year.

Pride & Prejudice won two awards including Best British Movie. Other winners included Star Wars: Episode III – Revenge of the Sith also with two awards and Charlie and the Chocolate Factory, Crash, King Kong, Kiss Kiss Bang Bang, Mrs Henderson Presents, Team America: World Police, The Descent,  and Wallace & Gromit: The Curse of the Were-Rabbit with one. Brian Cox received the Empire Icon Award, Stephen Frears received the Empire Inspiration Award, Tony Curtis received the Lifetime Achievement Award and the Harry Potter films received the Outstanding Contribution to British Cinema Award.

Winners and nominees
Winners are listed first and highlighted in boldface.

Multiple awards
The following two films received multiple awards:

Multiple nominations
The following 16 films received multiple nominations:

References

External links
 
 

Empire Award ceremonies
2005 film awards
2006 in London
2006 in British cinema
March 2006 events in the United Kingdom
2000s in the City of Westminster